Novosibirsky District is an administrative and municipal district (raion), one of the thirty in Novosibirsk Oblast, Russia. It is located in the east of the oblast. Its administrative center is the city of Novosibirsk (which is not administratively a part of the district). Population: 127,891 (2010 Census);

Administrative and municipal status
Within the framework of administrative divisions, Novosibirsky District is one of the thirty in the oblast. The city of Novosibirsk serves as its administrative center, despite being incorporated separately as an administrative unit with the status equal to that of the districts.

As a municipal division, the territory of the district is split between two municipal formations—Koltsovo Urban Okrug, which the work settlement of Koltsovo is incorporated as, and Novosibirsky Municipal District, which covers the rest of the administrative district's territory. The City of Novosibirsk is incorporated separately from the district as Novosibirsk Urban Okrug.

References

Notes

Sources

Districts of Novosibirsk Oblast
